Ecclesiastes 1 is the first chapter of the Book of Ecclesiastes in the Hebrew Bible or the Old Testament of the Christian Bible. The book contains philosophical speeches by a character called Qoheleth ("the Teacher"; 'one who speaks before an assembly') composed probably between the 5th and 2nd centuries BCE. Peshitta, Targum, and Talmud, as well as most Jewish and Christian readership, attribute the authorship of the book to King Solomon. This chapter contains the title of the book, the exposition of some fundamental observations and the problem of life, especially the failure of wisdom.

Text

The original text was written in Hebrew. This chapter is divided into 18 verses.

Textual witnesses
Some early manuscripts containing the text of this chapter in Hebrew are of the Masoretic Text, which includes Codex Leningradensis (1008). Fragments containing parts of this chapter were found among the Dead Sea Scrolls: 4QQoh (4Q110; 30 BCE30 CE; extant verses 8–15).

There is also a translation into Koine Greek known as the Septuagint, made in the last few centuries BCE. Extant ancient manuscripts of the Septuagint version include Codex Vaticanus (B; B; 4th century), Codex Sinaiticus (S; BHK: S; 4th century), and Codex Alexandrinus (A; A; 5th century). The Greek text is probably derived from the work of Aquila of Sinope or his followers.

Verse 1
The words of the Preacher, the son of David, king in Jerusalem.
Its verbal root  means 'to assemble'.
 "The son of David, king in Jerusalem" may refer to any king in the line of David ("Davidic King").

Prologue (verses 2–11)

Verse 2
Vanity of vanities, says the Preacher,
vanity of vanities! All is vanity.
The Lexham English Bible calls this verse the preacher's "motto". The motto appears again at the end of his teaching in Ecclesiastes 12:8. It can also be translated as 'Absurdity, Frustration, Futility, Nonsense'. The word appears five times in this verse alone and is found in 29 other verses in Ecclesiastes.

"Vanity of vanities" reflects the Hebrew: .

Verse 3
What profit has a man from all his labor
In which he toils under the sun?
This rhetorical question follows the claim of "vanity" and is followed by the portrayal of a world 'impervious to human effort.'

Verse 9
Verse 9 contains the well-known saying, "there is nothing new under the sun".

Verse 11
There is no remembrance of former things,
Nor will there be any remembrance of things that are to come
By those who will come after.
"So ends the prologue of the book, sounding its terrible sentence of despair on life and all its interests." Edward Plumptre argues that "former things" and "things ... to come" should be translated as "former men" and "those that shall come after". The New International Version translates this verse as "No one remembers the former generations, and even those yet to come will not be remembered by those who follow them".

The failure of wisdom (verses 12–18)
The problems declared in the earlier part are attempted to be solved using 'wisdom', but the conclusion in this part is that wisdom can only enlarge one's view of the problem but does not bring any solution, and the real solution is still to be anticipated. Biblical commentator Stuart Weeks reads these verses with chapter 2 as a single "fictional memoir" recounting the preacher's "quest for understanding".

Verse 13
I set my heart to seek and search out by wisdom concerning all that is done under heaven; this burdensome task God has given to the sons of man, by which they may be exercised.
The King James Version of this verse reads "I gave my heart ...", words "expressive of the spirit of an earnest seeker, [and] eminently characteristic of this book". In Hebrew thought, the heart is the seat of life, or emotion, but also the seat of reason.

Verse 18
For in much wisdom is much grief,
And he who increases knowledge increases sorrow
The Teacher (Qoheleth) pessimistically concludes that wisdom and knowledge only enhance 'vexation and sorrow'.

See also
 Related Bible parts: Psalm 127, Ecclesiastes 12

Notes

References

Sources

External links

 Jewish translations:
 Kohelet – Ecclesiastes - Chapter 1 (Judaica Press) translation [with Rashi's commentary] at Chabad.org
 Christian translations:
 Online Bible at GospelHall.org (ESV, KJV, Darby, American Standard Version, Bible in Basic English)
 Ecclesiastes Chapter 1 King James Version
  Various versions

01